San Ignacio Town Airstrip  is a public use airport serving San Ignacio, a town in the Cayo District of Belize.

It has a 718-meter runway and a small terminal building. Founded in 2012, it is operated by Tropic Air and served exclusively by this airline with single-engine Cessna 208 aircraft.

See also

Transport in Belize
List of airports in Belize

References

External links 
OurAirports - San Ignacio Town Airstrip
Aerodromes in Belize - pdf

Airports in Belize
Cayo District